There are numerous hadith manuscripts from the first four century after the death of Prophet Muhammad (632-1032CE). The number increases drastically in the following two centuries (1032-1232).

632-1032CE

MS. Leiden Or. 298
This is a book titled Gharib Al-Hadith. It was written by an early Islamic scholar, Abu Ubaid al-Qasim bin Salam (770-838). There's an incomplete manuscript of this book dated back to 252 AH (866CE). It is now kept at the Library of the University of Leiden.

Jami' of Ma'mar ibn Rashid
This is one of the earliest collection of hadith that was compiled by Imam Ma'mar ibn Rashid. Two manuscripts of this book have been found in Turkey. One of them is from Ankara and dating back to 364 AH (974CE). Another one is in Istanbul.

Ar-Risalah
This book was written by the  early Islamic scholar, Shafi‘i. Even though this is not a book written specifically in the field of hadith, it still contains dozens of hadiths. There are two manuscripts of this book at the National Library in Cairo. The first known as the manuscript of Ibn Jama'ah and the second one is the manuscript of Ar-Rabi'. Bernhard Moritz, the German orientalist dates the Ar-Rabi's manuscript to the middle of fourth century AH while Ahmad Muhammad Shakir dated it to shortly before 270 AH (883CE).

Abridged Sahih Bukhari
This is the oldest arabic manuscript kept at the National Library of Bulgaria. It was dated to 407 AH (1017CE). It contains books 65 through 69 of Sahih Bukhari but book 65 is incomplete. It can be viewed online at World Digital Library official website.

1033-1232CE

Al-Assad National Library no. 9388

This is a manuscript of Sahih Muslim of Imam Muslim. It was kept at the Al-Assad National Library in Damascus,Syria and was dated to the fifth century AH/11th century CE.

Or. 101
This is a manuscript of Jami' At-Tirmidhi of Imam Muhammad bin Isa At-Tirmidhi. It was dated to 540 AH and is now preserved at the Library of the University of Leiden.

1233-1432CE

Dublin copy of Sahih Bukhari
This is a manuscript of Sahih Bukhari kept at Chester Beatty Library in Dublin Ireland (no. 4176). It was copied by Ahmad bin Ali bin Abdul Wahhab in the fine calligraphic naskh script and was dated to 8 Muharram 694/ 28 November 1294.

References 

Hadith